Tirmizi, al-Tirmidhi, Termezi or Tarmizi — nisba means "from Termez" (in Persian, Arabic, etc.) and may refer to:
 Al-Tirmidhi — Islamic scholar, collector of hadith.
 Al-Hakim al-Tirmidhi — one of the great early authors of Sufism.
 Jahm bin Safwan al-Tirmidhi — Islamic theologian.
 Sayyid Ali Tirmizi, commonly known as Pir Baba — Sufi, supporter of the Mughal emperor Babur.
 Kasam Bapu Tirmizi — Indian politician.
 Salahuddin Tirmizi — Pakistani politician.
 Taufiq Tirmizi — Pakistani cricketer.
 Tarmizi Taher — Indonesia's Minister of Religious Affairs from 1993 to 1998.
 Tarmizi Johari — Bruneian international footballer.
 Izham Tarmizi — Malaysian footballer.
 Wan Mohamad Tarmizi — Malaysian association football referee.
  — Persian poet.
  — Persian poet.
  — Medieval Sufi philosopher.
  — Pakistani religious leader.

See also 
 Jami' al-Tirmidhi, also known as Sunan at-Tirmidhi — one of "The Six Books".

Toponymic surnames
Nisbas
Persian-language surnames
Arabic-language surnames
People from Surxondaryo Region